Ernest Robert Maling English DSO (2 December 1874 — 18 August 1941) was a British soldier, cricketer and actor.

English was born in Charlton Kings, Cheltenham. He attended Wellington College and the Royal Military College, Sandhurst, receiving his commission in 1895. and became  Adjutant of the King's Shropshire Light Infantry.

He served in the Second Boer War and World War I, receiving wounds in both wars. He was prompted to Captain in 1909. In 1910, he became Adjutant of the King's Regiment (Liverpool). He became a major in 1915. He was awarded the Distinguished Service Order in 1917, the Croix de Guerre and was twice Mentioned in dispatches. He left the army as a  lieutenant colonel on 29 November 1919.

Subsequently, he worked as a stage and film actor. He died in South Kensington on 18 August 1941.

Cricket career
English was a right-handed batsman who played for Gloucestershire.
English made a single first-class appearance for the team, during the 1909 season, against Middlesex. He scored a duck in the first innings in which he batted, and two runs in the second.

References

External links
Ernest English at Cricket Archive 

1874 births
1941 deaths
British Army personnel of World War I
British military personnel of the Second Boer War
Companions of the Distinguished Service Order
English cricketers
Gloucestershire cricketers
King's Regiment (Liverpool) officers
King's Shropshire Light Infantry officers
People educated at Wellington College, Berkshire
Sportspeople from Cheltenham